The Harbor of La Rochelle is an oil-on-canvas painting by French artist Jean-Baptiste-Camille Corot, created in 1851. It is held at the Yale University Art Gallery, in New Haven. 

It depicts the harbor of La Rochelle on the Bay of Biscay. Although Corot was producing his renowned grey landscapes by 1851, this painting recalls his earlier style. It is notable for being a finished study that Corot chose to exhibit at the Paris Salon of 1852, as he usually preferred to exhibit compositions of religious or literary subjects.

References

Paintings by Jean-Baptiste-Camille Corot
1851 paintings
Landscape paintings
Paintings in the Yale University Art Gallery
Horses in art
Ships in art